Mohd Amir Mohd Yusof is a Malaysian international lawn bowler.

Bowls career
Ariffin won the bronze medal in the triples with Azim Azami Ariffin and Azwan Shuhaimi at the 2008 World Outdoor Bowls Championship in Christchurch. 

He won three medals at the Asia Pacific Bowls Championships, including the 2009 fours gold medal, in the singles, in Kuala Lumpur  and two gold medals in bowls events at the Southeast Asian Games.

References

1983 births
Malaysian male bowls players
Living people
Southeast Asian Games medalists in lawn bowls
Southeast Asian Games gold medalists for Malaysia
Competitors at the 2007 Southeast Asian Games
Competitors at the 2017 Southeast Asian Games